Dhanwada or Dhanvada is a mandal in the Narayanpet district of Telangana, India. This mandal is part of the Narayanapet Assembly Constituency and the Mahbubnagar Loksabha Constituency.

Geography

Institutions
 Zilla Parishad High School
 Andhra Bank
 TS Model School
 Government Junior College 
 Kasturba Gandhi High School
 Mahindra Solar Power Park

Temples
 Venkataramana Temple
 Markandeyaswamy Temple
 Veerabadhraswamy Temple
 Shirdi Sai Temple

Villages
The villages in Dhanwada Mandal include:
 Appampally 	
 Cherlapally 	
 Dhanwada 	
 Gotur 	
 Gunmukla 	
 Hanmanpalle 	
 Kamsanpalle 	
 Kistapur
 Kondapur 	
 Madwar 	
 Mandipalle 	
 Marikal 	
 Paspula 	
 Peddachintakunta 	
 Poosalpad 	
 Rakonda
 Ramakistaiahpalle 	
 Teelair 	
 Yeligandla

References

Mandals in Mahbubnagar district